Zombielicious is the fourth studio album of Zombie Nation. It was written and produced by the German techno and electro DJ Florian Senfter. The artwork was designed by Designliga and features an outside Jewelcase screen print.

Track listing

Singles 
 Forza (October 2008, UKW Records), remixes by Housmeister and Fukkk Offf
 Worth It (March 2009, UKW Records)
 Zombielicious remixed (June 2009, Turbo Records)

References

External links
 Official website
 Official Website of UKW Records
Discogs page
Zombie Nation on Last.fm
 http://www.designliga.de

2009 albums
Zombie Nation (band) albums